Ham Hindu Nahin (Translation: We are not Hindus), also spelled as Hum Hindu Nahin, is a 19th-century Punjabi book by Kahn Singh Nabha, on the distinction of the Sikhism and identity. First published in 1898, the book was registered under this title in the Punjab Gazette on June 30, 1899, at number 447.

Pressing its claim vehemently and vigorously to the distinction of the Sikh identity and religion, it concludes with a versified note by the author, describing the characteristics of the Khalsa.

Subject and need to write 

When there were a lot of misconceptions 
and questions raised upon the Different identity of Sikh Religion and it being a sect of Hindu Religion, Bhai Kahn Singh Nabha wrote this book in order to clarify and answer those misconceptions and questions. The book was principally written as a response to a provocative book published by Thakur Das, a Sanatan Sikh, titled Sikh Hindu Hain (“Sikhs Are Hindus”). 
In this book, the writer discusses about the differences in between the beliefs of Hindu faith and the Sikh faith in depth along with the letters which writer received from various Sikh Scholars and Prominent Sikh Shrines, in favor of this book. 
The book gives deep analysis along with references to religious texts and Historical incidents.

See also 
Mahan Kosh

References 

Punjabi-language books
History of Punjab
History of Sikhism
Books about British India